This was the first edition of the tournament.

Oleksii Krutykh won the title after defeating Luca Van Assche 6–2, 6–0 in the final.

Seeds

Draw

Finals

Top half

Bottom half

References

External links
Main draw
Qualifying draw

Copa Faulcombridge - 1